Oregon Route 201 is a north–south state highway in eastern Oregon. It currently runs from the Idaho state line just south of Adrian to Interstate 84 south of Huntington. Between the state line and Succor Creek Road, it is known the Homedale Spur No. 490. Between Succor Creek Road and Nyssa, it is known as the Succor Creek Highway No. 450 (see Oregon highways and routes), including the Homedale Spur of the same highway. Between Nyssa and Cairo Junction, it is part of the Central Oregon Highway No. 7 as a concurrency with U.S. Route 20 and U.S. Route 26, and north of Cairo Junction, it is the Olds Ferry-Ontario Highway No. 455. At the Idaho state line, Oregon Route 201 becomes State Highway 19.

An unbuilt extension of the Succor Creek Highway is designated southward from the start of the Homedale Spur to US 95.

History
Oregon Route 201 originally existed only as the Succor Creek Highway. It continued south of Adrian via Jordan Valley to McDermitt, where it continued as Nevada State Route 8. The route was completely decommissioned in 1940 with the extension of U.S. Route 95 through Oregon. It would not see new life until U.S. Route 30 was rerouted around Farewell Bend on roughly its current route.

Nearly all of the route north of Nyssa was once part of the historical route of U.S. Route 30 or an associated route. In fact, until 1980, Oregon Route 201's north terminus was at its current junction with U.S. Route 95 Spur, which was at the time U.S. Route 30N.

A bypass was recently built around Ontario.

Major intersections
Note: mileposts do not reflect actual mileage due to realignments.

References

201
Transportation in Malheur County, Oregon
Ontario, Oregon
Ontario, Oregon micropolitan area
U.S. Route 30